The Division I First-Team All-Americans are the best eleven Division I U.S. college soccer players as selected by United Soccer Coaches.

1970–1983

From 1970 to 1983 the NCSAA only named defenders and forwards in addition to one goalkeeper.

* – repeat selection

1983–present

Beginning with the 1983 season, the NSCAA began naming midfielders in addition to forwards and defenders.
* – repeat selection
Scholar Player of the Year in bold

Notes and references

External links
 NSCAA Archives

College soccer trophies and awards in the United States
Soccer in the United States lists
NCAA Men's Soccer All-Americans